GURPS Terradyne is an original worldbook for GURPS. It is a future history suitable for a Hard Science Fiction campaign, in the tradition of stories by Robert A. Heinlein, Lester del Ray and Ben Bova or the manga/anime Planetes.

Contents
Technology has moved man out into space but not out of the solar system yet. Mars is being terraformed but isn't fully habitable yet. Terradyne, a space-based corporate state, dominates but does not have exclusive control of space-based industries.

Publication history
GURPS Terradyne was designed by Russell Brown and Mark Waltz, and edited by Creede Lambard, and published by Steve Jackson Games as a 128-page softcover book. Illustrations are by Ruth Thompson, Michael Barrett, Angela Bostick, Steve Crompton, C. Bradford Gorby, Denis Loubet, Rick Lowry, Michael Surbrook, and John Waltrip, with a cover by Alan Gutierrez.

It was superseded by the Transhuman Space series which covers the same niche.  Some material on Mars was incorporated into Transhuman Space: In The Well.

Reception
Rick Swan reviewed GURPS Terradyne for Dragon magazine #190 (February 1993). In his evaluation, Swan comments: "By emphasizing technology over space opera, Terradyne'''s sober tone compares favorably to GDW's MegaTraveller'' game and other hard science-fiction RPGs. Though the dystopian outlook may strike some as overly familiar - how many times have we been warned about grasping corporations? - the thoughtful presentation results in a compelling study of greed gone amuck. And it's user-friendly to boot; except for a few pages devoted to character design, there aren't many new rules to navigate."

References

Campaign settings
Terradyne
Role-playing game supplements introduced in 1991
Science fiction role-playing games